This article lists the presidents of Republika Srpska.

Presidents of Republika Srpska (1992–present)

Timeline

Notes

See also
List of vice presidents of Republika Srpska
List of prime ministers of Republika Srpska
List of speakers of the National Assembly of Republika Srpska

Standards

References

External links
World Statesmen – Republika Srpska

Presidents
Republika Srpska
Presidents of Republika Srpska